The gens Ateia was a plebeian family at Rome.  The gens does not appear to have been particularly large or important, and is known from a small number of individuals.

Members

 Marcus Ateius, the first soldier to climb the walls of Athens during the siege of that city by Sulla in 86 BC.
 Gaius Ateius Capito, tribune of the plebs in 55 BC, famous for announcing terrible omens upon the departure of Crassus for Syria.
 Gaius Ateius C. f. Capito, one of the most distinguished jurists of the early Empire, and consul suffectus in AD 5.
 Lucius Ateius Praetextatus, surnamed Philologus, a notable grammarian of the first century BC.
 Ateius Sanctus, an incorrect form of T. Aius Sanctus, the orator and a teacher of  the emperor Commodus.

See also
 List of Roman gentes

References

Bibliography 
Tim Cornell (editor), The Fragments of the Roman Historians, Oxford University Press, 2013.

Roman gentes